Environmental law is a collective term describing the network of treaties, statutes, etc, addressing the effects of human activity on the natural environment.

Environmental Law may also refer to:

 Environmental Law (journal), a law review journal published by Lewis & Clark Law School

See also
, including articles on environmental law in a number of countries